John Mark Totich  (born Ivan Marko Totić, 18 May 1882 – 18 October 1957) was a notable New Zealand gum-digger, boarding-house keeper, community leader and consul. He was born in Kuna, Dalmatia, in 1882.

In the 1954 Queen's Birthday Honours, Totich was appointed a Member of the Order of the British Empire, for social welfare services.

References

1882 births
1957 deaths
People from Orebić
Croatian emigrants to New Zealand
People from the Northland Region
New Zealand Members of the Order of the British Empire
New Zealand gum-diggers